Danil Aleksandrovich Luppa (born 24 May 1998) is a Russian football player who plays for FC Dynamo Bryansk.

Club career
He made his debut in the Russian Football National League for FC Dynamo Bryansk on 8 August 2020 in a game against FC Yenisey Krasnoyarsk, he substituted Igor Khaymanov at half-time.

References

External links
 
 Profile by Russian Football National League
 

1998 births
Sportspeople from Bryansk
Living people
Russian footballers
Association football defenders
FC Dynamo Bryansk players